←2006 - 2007 - 2008→

This is a list of Japanese television dramas often called doramas by fans.

2007 winter season
Series

Specials
 Maison Ikkoku (めぞん一刻) - starring Misaki Ito, Taiki Nakabayashi, Kayoko Kishimoto, Ittoku Kishibe, and Yumiko Takahashi 
 Attention Please: Honolulu - starring Aya Ueto, Ryo Nishikido

2007 spring season
Series

The seventh episode of Sexy Voice and Robo was not aired because the setting of the episode's story was similar to a kidnapping that happened around that time. The kidnapping caused the death of a police officer, and thus the episode was cancelled as not to be an unpleasant reminder of the event. The episode was replaced by a re-run of episode two, causing a dramatic decrease in the series' viewership. In actuality, only ten episodes were aired.

2007 summer season
Series

2007 fall season
Series

See also
 List of Japanese television dramas

References

 List of Japanese Television Dramas
Dramas, 2007